is a thoroughbred horse racing simulation video game produced by Koei for the PlayStation 2. Although the G1 Jockey series had been gaining popularity in Japan, this was the first game in the series to be released in North America. In contrast to Tecmo's Gallop Racer series, which focuses on every aspect of horse racing (including breeding), G1 Jockey 3 focuses solely on the jockey.

Reception

The game received above-average reviews according to the review aggregation website Metacritic. GameSpots Ryan Davis said that while the game is not very different from the Gallop Racer series, "ultimately, G1 Jockey 3 delivers a more focused, more satisfying experience that seems less like an abstract interpretation of horse racing and more like the real thing." He went on to say that the "presentation is still pretty modest, and much of the game mechanics are too baroque for those without a real passion for horse racing." In Japan, Famitsu gave it a score of 29 out of 40.

References

External links
 

2002 video games
Horse racing video games
Koei games
Koei Tecmo franchises
PlayStation 2 games
PlayStation 2-only games
Video game sequels
Video games developed in Japan